Turania is a  (municipality) in the Province of Rieti in the Italian region of Latium, located about  northeast of Rome and about  southeast of Rieti.

Turania borders the following municipalities: Carsoli, Collalto Sabino, Collegiove, Pozzaglia Sabina, Vivaro Romano.

References

Cities and towns in Lazio